Sociedad Deportiva Deusto is a Spanish football team based in Deusto (Greater Bilbao), in the autonomous community of Basque Country. Founded in 1913, it plays in the Tercera División RFEF – Group 4, holding home games at Campo de Fútbol de Etxezuri, with a capacity of 1,000 seats.

History

Club names
Sociedad Deportiva Deusto (1913–50, 1964–)
Sociedad Deportiva Deusto-Universidad (1950–1964)

Season to season

22 seasons in Tercera División
1 season in Tercera División RFEF

References

External links
Official website 
La Preferente profile 

Football clubs in the Basque Country (autonomous community)
Association football clubs established in 1913
1913 establishments in Spain